North Iredell High School is public high school located in Olin, North Carolina. North, as it is called locally, was established in 1966 as part of the consolidation of high schools in Iredell County. It is part of the Iredell-Statesville Schools district.

Description
North Iredell High School is one of 10 high schools in Iredell County and is part of the Statesville-Iredell public school district.  The student body is 53 percent male and 47 percent female, with a 25 percent minority enrollment in 2021.  North has an 85 percent graduation rate. Twenty nine percent of the students are enrolled in Advanced Placement courses.

Music groups
Musical ensembles at North include: Marching Raiders and color guard, wind ensemble, concert band, Mixed Choir, and Advanced Choir, as well as extra curricular jazz band, basketball band, and pit orchestra.

Notable alumni
Blake Crouch, author best known for his Wayward Pines Trilogy
Matt Matheny, former college basketball head coach

References

Educational institutions established in 1966
Public high schools in North Carolina
Schools in Iredell County, North Carolina
1966 establishments in North Carolina